Porcellionides cilicius is a woodlouse that can be found on Cyprus and in Turkey. The species have one subspecies Porcellionides cilicius antiochensis that can be found only on Cyprus.

References

Porcellionidae
Crustaceans described in 1901